Reina is the third studio album by the Mexican electropop band Kinky. It was released on September 5, 2006 on Nettwerk. The album's lyrics are sung more in English than Spanish, unlike Kinky's two preceding albums, Kinky (2002) and Atlas (2003).  Reina is a mixture of many musical styles with electronica, Latin percussion, traditional Mexican accordion, heavy rock electric guitars and bass guitars all occupying the same musical space.  Guest singer Colin Hay of Men at Work provides guest vocals on "Monday Killer."  "How Do They Do That?" has even drawn comparisons to the 1990s American alternative rock group Morphine.

A music video was released for the lead song, "Sister Twisted", in September 2006. In the music video, a Mexican cowboy, played by David Bernal, does a twisted locking and popping while a war against aliens occurs in the background.

The album received mixed reviews.

Reina was re-released on Feb. 5th, 2008 with two additional tracks: a new remix of "A Donde Van Los Muertos" by Brazilian Girls and a cover of Wall of Voodoo's hit, "Mexican Radio."

Track listing
"Sister Twisted" – 3:16
"I Say Hey" – 3:06
"Una Línea de Luz" – 3:36
"Again and So On" – 2:39
"How Do They Do That?" – 2:37
"León" – 3:47
"Monday Killer" – 3:44
"¿A Dónde Van Los Muertos?" – 4:17
"Lay Back" – 3:47
"Nothing Really" – 3:38
"Uruapan Breaks" – 2:21
"Spin That Wine" – 3:09

References

External links
Review at Boston.com  (neutral)

2006 albums
Kinky (band) albums
Nettwerk Records albums